The Guy Wulfrunian was a British front-engined double-decker bus chassis produced by Guy Motors from 1959 to 1965.

History
The Wulfrunian was developed jointly by Guy and the West Riding Automobile Company, and, of 137 vehicles built, 126 went to West Riding. A further four were acquired second hand and put into service, two from County Motors of Lepton and one each from West Wales and Lancashire United. Two demonstrator vehicle were acquired from Guy but were cannibalised for spares. Single vehicles were tried by operators in Lancashire, Wolverhampton and West Wales, but this did not lead to any further orders. After maintenance and reliability issues, West Riding cancelled an order for a further 25 vehicles.

The cost of developing the vehicle, combined with the lack of sales, led to enormous losses for Guy, who first went into receivership in 1961, before finally ceasing production for the UK bus market in 1969.

The vehicle
The Wulfrunian was introduced at the Commercial Motor Show in 1958 as a "concept" vehicle designed for one man bus services (i.e. without a conductor). However, it was unusual, compared to other developments at the time, such as the Leyland Atlantean and the Daimler Fleetline, in that it combined a front entrance and a front engine (other operators were favouring rear-engined vehicles). Later, in 1974, the front-engined, front-entrance Volvo Ailsa B55 came onto the British bus market and was successful.

This was the first bus to have air suspension, disc brakes and independent front suspension. The engine, a 10.45-litre Gardner 6LX, was located beside the driver, with the front axle moved back to create space for the entrance. However, the use of so many untested features led to reliability issues, particularly with the brakes and suspension.

In most of the Wulfrunians built, the staircase was situated on the nearside of the vehicle, immediately behind the entrance. To accommodate this, the four-piece folding entrance doors were of different sizes. The nearside rearward ascending staircase gave the driver full view of the stairwell. In the lower saloon, after the area taken up for the staircase, the first twin-seat faced rearwards and gave a cosy, relaxed feel to the interior.

Two demonstrators were built, 7800DA and 8072DA, both vehicles being painted in Wolverhampton Wanderers' colours of yellow and black. 7800DA had six more seats than 8072DA, and, cleverly, the seating capacity of each vehicle was hidden in the registration number.

The majority of vehicles were fitted with Roe bodies, with the others being bodied by Northern Counties (1) and East Lancashire Coachbuilders (5).

The survivors 
Only a small number of Wulfrunians were sold on for further service and one of these, WHL970, passed through several operators before being rescued for preservation. This has been the subject of a thorough restoration (into the original red ex-tramway route livery) at the Dewsbury Bus Museum and joined the only other survivor, UCX275, back on the road in 2022. UCX275 was new to County Motors of Lepton in 1961, staying with them only a year or so before passing to West Riding. Upon withdrawal in 1972, she passed straight into preservation with the West Riding Wulfrunian Preservation Society, which had been formed the previous year specifically to save a Wulfrunian.

References

External links

 Dewsbury Bus Museum's Guy Wulfrunian Flickr Album
 HuddersfielD Passenger Transport Group - The Guy Wulfrunian (images)

Buses of the United Kingdom
Low-floor buses
Double-decker buses